Hemigobius hoevenii, commonly known as the banded mulletgoby, is a species of goby which occurs in the western Indo-Pacific region from Thailand to New Guinea and northern Australia where it is found in mangroves. The specific name most likely honours the Dutch ichthyologist Jan van der Hoeven (1801-1868) who has been honoured by Pieter Bleeker in a number of names for taxa.

References 

Fish of Thailand
Gobionellinae
Fish described in 1851